Salvador Flores Rivera (January 14, 1920 – August 5, 1987), also known as Chava Flores, was a Mexican composer and singer of popular and folkloric music. His songs often described the lives of Mexico City's ordinary people.

Biography 
Flores was born in the old La Merced neighborhood, in México City historical center, at the calle de La Soledad. It is presumed he grew up in Tacuba, in Colonia Roma  and in Santa Maria la Ribera, although he is also located in Azcapotzalco and Unidad Cuitláhuac, where he lived until 1933, when he moved to Morelia, Michoacán. His father died in 1933, so he had to start working to contribute to the support of his family.

El Álbum de Oro de la Canción 
Chava Flores had many jobs since his childhood; he worked as a tailor, warehouse manager, collector, door-to-door salesman, a hardware store administrator, owner of a shirt and sausage store and a printer, among other things.  All of those occupations involved moving throughout the city, which was very useful when he became a composer because, he traveled to neighborhoods, streets and colonies, and witnessed various situations that would later translate into his songs. Thanks to that he was awarded the title of Cronista Cantor de la Ciudad de México (Mexico City's singing chronicler)

In 1946, he had to close his shirt store. With his colleagues in the hardware store, Flores began his work in a printing press; In the beginning, things worked in a regular way but, the press began to improve in 1949  when it published the magazine El Álbun de Oro de la Canción (The Golden Album of Songs).

First songs 
Flores debuted with the song "Dos Horas de Balazos". To this song he added "La tertulia", both were recorded by RCA Victor in 1952. He acted in the tents and cabarets of the city, and gained fame in the rest of the country, in Latin America and in the United States. By 1976, he had already recorded seven full-length albums, and owned the label Ageleste.

Moving to Morelia and death 
In 1983, he moved to the city of Morelia, Michoacán, where he had a television program. The following year, he was rushed to Mexico City, and died a few days later.

Tribute
On January 14, 2017, Google celebrated his 97th birthday with a Google Doodle.

Some of his songs 
Flores's songs featured a popular language, with double entendres and wordplays. Some of his compositions are:

Interpreters of his songs

Filmography

Actor 
 La esquina de mi barrio, 1957, dir. Fernando Méndez (credited as Salvador Flores)
 Mi influyente mujer, 1957, dir. Rogelio A. González
 Bajo el cielo de México, 1958, dir. Rafael Baledón
 El correo del norte, 1960, dir. Zacarías Gómez Urquiza
 Rebelde sin casa, 1960, dir. Benito Alazraki
 La máscara de la muerte, 1961, dir. Zacarías Gómez Urquiza
 4 hembras y un macho menos, 1979, dir. Del Tal Gomezbeck
 ¿A qué le tiras cuando sueñas... mexicano?, 1979, dir. Arturo Martínez

Composer 
 Mujer, así es la vida, 1980, dir. Armando Lazo (Original score by him and Amparo Ochoa) 
 4 hembras y un macho menos, 1979, dir. Del Tal Gomezbeck (sSábado, Distrito Federal" y "El retrato de Manuela")

Notes

External links 
 Chava Flores, un sociólogo a la altura de los grandes maestros de la música, artículo del Consejo Nacional para la Cultura y las Artes
 Biografía de Chava Flores
 Biografía de Chava Flores en la Sociedad de Autores y Compositores de México (SACM)
 Sitio web oficial de Chava Flores y de su disquera Ageleste
 Podcast sobre Flores de Shot Informativo, Tec de Monterrey

1987 deaths
1920 births
Singers from Mexico City
Mexican composers of popular or traditional folk music
20th-century Mexican male singers